Khavidak (also Romanized as Khavīdak) is a village in Fahraj Rural District, in the Central District of Yazd County, Yazd Province, Iran. At the 2006 census, its population was 985, in 234 families.

References 

Populated places in Yazd County